Paul Clarvis is an English percussionist.

Biography
Born in Enfield, Clarvis was the late Leonard Bernstein's preferred percussionist in London and featured as a soloist on the last night of the Proms in 1996 in a concerto for saxophone and drum kit by Sir Harrison Birtwhistle. In 1998 he was chairman of the Percussion judges for the BBC Young Musician of the Year and together with Sonia Slany he started Villagelife Records.

Clarvis also helped Rick Smith with the drum arrangement for the London Olympics 2012 opening, writing Dame Evelyn Glennie's part and together with Smith, assisted in the training of the ceremony's 1000 drummers.

Bands
Clarvis has worked with a number of notable musicians: Mick Jagger, Nina Simone, Stevie Wonder, Steve Swallow, Sir Harrison Birtwistle, Sir John Dankworth to Sir Paul McCartney, John Taylor and Moondog, Gordon Beck, Bryan Ferry and Elton John. He has recorded with Marc Ribot, Sam Rivers, Richard Thompson, The Orb, John Adams, Michael Nyman, Loreena McKennitt, Mark Anthony Turnage and Michel Legrand as well as his own band Orquestra Mahatma.

He regularly holds gigs with Mose Allison and has also played with Nina Simone, Herbie Hancock and Ravi Shankar.

Film
Clarvis has contributed to a number of films:

Star Wars
Harry Potter
The Chronicles of Narnia
Twilight films
Dark Knight
Constant Gardner
The Bourne Ultimatum,
Burn After Reading
Shakespeare in Love
Fantastic Mr Fox
Billy Elliot
James Bond
Robin Hood
G.I. Jane
Notting Hill
Tron
The Mummy
The Golden Compass
Bee Movie
Troy
State of Play
The Road
The Last King of Scotland
Spy Game
Elizabeth: The Golden Age
The Escapist
Thunderbirds
V for Vendetta
The Passion
King Arthur
Dorian Gray
Kingdom of Heaven
Around the World in 80 Days
Alien vs. Predator
Madagascar
On a Clear Day
Captain Corelli's Mandolin
Captain America
Shrek
Hugo Cabret
Kung Fu Panda
Lord of the Rings
Prometheus
the Hobbit
The Great Gatsby
Ten Minutes Older

Clarvis had also worked on; Quills (band member: The Quills Specialist Band), The Cell (first percussion), The Miracle Maker (ethnic percussion), The Next Best Thing (percussion), The Darkest Light (percussion), Beautiful People (percussion), East Is East (drums and percussion), Heart (percussion), Beloved (featured musician), The Mighty (percussion), My Son the Fanatic (musician) and many more.

References

External links

1963 births
Living people
People from Enfield, London
British percussionists